Kazuto Ishida (May 20, 1903 – May 9, 1979) was the 5th Chief Justice of Japan (1969–1973). He was a practitioner of kendo. He was a graduate of the University of Tokyo. 

As an associate justice in the mid-1960s, Ishida penned a dissenting opinion in a Grand Bench decision limiting criminal prosecution of labor leaders. This was a contributing factor to his appointment as Chief Justice by Prime Minister Eisaku Sato in 1968, in an attempt to give the court more conservative leadership at a time when Japan saw massive radical student demonstrations. One of Ishida's final decisions, in 1973, expanded police powers to punish demonstrators. Ishida's court was the first in a line of conservative Supreme Court benches that continued into the early 21st century.

After his tenure as Chief Justice, Ishida formed the National Congress to Achieve Legislation of the Gengo System in order to establish a law authorizing the Emperor to determine Japanese era names.

Ishida was a recipient of the Order of the Rising Sun and a member of the All Japan Kendo Federation.

References

Bibliography

山本祐司『最高裁物語（上・下）』（日本評論社、1994年）（講談社+α文庫、1997年）

1903 births
1979 deaths
Chief justices of Japan
Grand Cordons of the Order of the Rising Sun
University of Tokyo alumni
People from Fukui Prefecture